Dennis Victor Crookes (born 18 June 1931) is a former South African cricketer and businessman who played first-class cricket for Cambridge University in 1953 and 1954.

Dennis Crookes was educated at Michaelhouse in Natal and Jesus College, Cambridge. After his studies at Cambridge he returned to Natal, where he worked for CG Smith Sugar later Illovo Sugar, and served the family sugar-growing company Crookes Brothers as chairman from 1993 to 1998.

References

External links

1931 births
Living people
Cricketers from Durban
Alumni of Michaelhouse
South African cricketers
Cambridge University cricketers
South African businesspeople
Alumni of Jesus College, Cambridge